1262 Sniadeckia, provisional designation , is a carbonaceous background asteroid from the asteroid belt's outer regions, approximately 54 kilometers in diameter. It was discovered on 23 March 1933, by Belgian astronomer Sylvain Arend at the Royal Observatory of Belgium in Uccle. The asteroid was named for Polish astronomer Jan Śniadecki. It has a notably low eccentricity of only 0.005.

Orbit and classification 

Sniadeckia is a non-family asteroid from the main belt's background population. It orbits the Sun in the outer asteroid belt at a distance of 2.99–3.00 AU once every 5 years and 2 months (1,900 days; semi-major axis of 3.00 AU). Its orbit has an eccentricity of only 0.005 and an inclination of 13° with respect to the ecliptic.

The body's observation arc begins with its official discovery observation at Uccle in 1933.

Physical characteristics 

In the SMASS classification, Sniadeckia is a carbonaceous C-type asteroid.

Rotation period 

In January 1984, the first and best-rated rotational lightcurve of Sniadeckia was obtained from photometric observations by astronomer Richard Binzel. Lightcurve analysis gave a rotation period of 17.57 hours with a brightness variation of 0.16 magnitude. French amateur astronomer Laurent Bernasconi measured an alternative period of 21.2 with an amplitude of 0.10 magnitude in April 2006.

Diameter and albedo 

According to the surveys carried out by the Infrared Astronomical Satellite IRAS, the Japanese Akari satellite and the NEOWISE mission of NASA's Wide-field Infrared Survey Explorer, Sniadeckia measures between 51.34 and 71.011 kilometers in diameter and its surface has an albedo between 0.028 and 0.0529.

The Collaborative Asteroid Lightcurve Link derives an albedo of 0.0563 and a diameter of 51.55 kilometers based on an absolute magnitude of 10.18.

Naming 

This minor planet was named by Tadeusz Banachiewicz after Jan Śniadecki (1756–1830), a Polish professor of mathematics and astronomy, who founded the Kraków Observatory. The lunar crater Sniadecki is also named in his honor. The official naming citation was mentioned in The Names of the Minor Planets by Paul Herget in 1955.

References

External links 
 Asteroid Lightcurve Database (LCDB), query form (info )
 Dictionary of Minor Planet Names, Google books
 Asteroids and comets rotation curves, CdR – Observatoire de Genève, Raoul Behrend
 Discovery Circumstances: Numbered Minor Planets (1)-(5000) – Minor Planet Center
 
 

001262
Discoveries by Sylvain Arend
Named minor planets
001262
19330323